Steppin' Out - The Collection, released on 29 September 2014, is a Joe Jackson compilation album, covering his period with A&M Records between the years 1979 and 1989. This album has different and fewer numbers than the earlier compilation album This Is It! (The A&M Years 1979–1989) from February 1997, covering the same period with A&M.

Track listing
All songs written and arranged by Joe Jackson, except where noted.

References 

2014 compilation albums
Joe Jackson (musician) albums
A&M Records compilation albums